Laran is the Etruscan god of war.

Laran may also refer to:
Laran, Hautes-Pyrénées, a town in France
Laran, Iran, a village in Iran
Laran-e Olya, a village in Iran
Laran-e Sofla, a village in Iran
Laran District, an administrative subdivision of Iran